Cleopa David Msuya (born 4 January 1931) is a former Prime Minister of Tanzania from 7 November 1980 to 24 February 1983 and again from 7 December 1994 to 28 November 1995.

Msuya was born in Chomvu, Usangi, in the Mwanga District of Kilimanjaro Region. He attended Makerere University College from 1952 to 1955, and he worked in social and community development in rural areas from 1956 to 1964. Beginning in 1964, he served as Permanent Secretary at a number of ministries: he was Permanent Secretary at the Ministry of Community Development and Culture from 1964 to 1965, at the Ministry of Lands Settlement and Water Development from 1965 to 1967, at the Ministry of Economic Affairs and Planning from 1967 to 1970, and at the Ministry of Finance from 1970 to 1972.

He became Minister for Finance on February 18, 1972 and served in that position until he became Minister for Industry on November 3, 1975. After five years as Minister for Industry, he became Prime Minister in November 1980, serving until February 1983; he was then Minister for Finance again from February 1983 to November 1985. On November 6, 1985 his portfolio was expanded and he became Minister for Finance, Economic Affairs and Planning until March 1989. From March 1989 to December 1990 he was Minister for Finance again, and from March 1990 to December 1994 he was Minister for Industry and Trade.

In December 1994, Msuya became Prime Minister for a second time, concurrently serving as Vice President. He was replaced in those posts in November 1995; in the 1995 parliamentary election, he was elected to the National Assembly again, and he served out the parliamentary term as a backbencher. He retired on October 29, 2000.

Since his retirement, Msuya has remained active in the Chama Cha Mapinduzi (CCM), and as of 2006 he remains on the CCM's National Executive Committee. As of 2006, he is also Chairman of the Kilimanjaro Development Forum.

On 23 October 2019 Cleopa Msuya, at the age of 88, was appointed by the President of the United Republic of Tanzania to be the Chancellor of Ardhi Institute.

References

1931 births
Living people
People from Kilimanjaro Region
Chama Cha Mapinduzi politicians
Prime Ministers of Tanzania
Vice-presidents of Tanzania
Finance Ministers of Tanzania
Industry ministers of Tanzania
Planning ministers of Tanzania
Trade ministers of Tanzania
Makerere University alumni